Fred Stabb (14 February 1920 – 1 October 2011) was an Australian rules footballer who played with Collingwood in the Victorian Football League (VFL).

Notes

External links 

		
Profile on Collingwood Forever

1920 births
2011 deaths
Australian rules footballers from Victoria (Australia)
Collingwood Football Club players
Northcote Football Club players